Coleophora aequalella is a moth of the family Coleophoridae. It is found in southern Russia, Iran, Uzbekistan and Afghanistan.

Adults are on wing in May and June.

References

aequalella
Moths described in 1872
Moths of Asia